The 2019–20 Biathlon World Cup – Pursuit Men started on 14 December 2019 in Hochfilzen and was finished on 14 March 2020 in Kontiolahti.

Competition format
The  pursuit race is skied over five laps. The biathlete shoots four times at any shooting lane, in the order of prone, prone, standing, standing, totalling 20 targets. For each missed target a biathlete has to run a  penalty loop. Competitors' starts are staggered, according to the result of the previous sprint race.

2018–19 Top 3 standings

Medal winners

Standings

Notes

References

Pursuit Men